M1902 may refer to:

 3-inch M1902 field gun - A US Army gun
 3-inch M1902 seacoast gun - A US Army gun not related to the field gun
 Colt M1902 pistol
 76 mm divisional gun M1902 - A Russian artillery piece
 76 mm divisional gun M1902/30